Osita Agwuna (22 December 1921 – 2007) was a Nigerian activist who was deputy president of the Zikist Movement in 1947. He was among a group of young Zikist members who expressed militant criticism of colonial rule and urged concerted action to overcome colonialism. Agwuna later became known as the Eze of Enugu Ukwu, serving the town in that position for 5 decades.

Biography
Beginning in 1947, the Zikist movement under the leadership of Raji Abdallah and his deputy, Agwuna embraced a radical strategy termed positive action which encouraged civil disobedience to actualize nationalist goals. Two major incidents added fire to this strategy, a racial discrimination incident against a black officer at Bristol hotel and the shooting of Nigerian striking workers in Burutu. In 1948, the group published A Call for Revolution which called for civil obedience and written in a way as to provoke radical actions to end colonialism. Delivering a speech on October 27, 1948, Agwuna argued that the country was a police state and positive action such as strikes, boycotts and civil disobedience were necessary to free Nigerians from an exploitative colonial state.Three days after the speech, Agwuna was charged with sedition, an action he had anticipated on the calculation that the movement's subversive publications, arrest of members and harassment would provoke positive action by Nigerians and also divert attention towards a common enemy. Also, they had calculated that Azikiwe would be arrested. However, Azikiwe was not arrested and their ideas had not yet permeated most Nigerian towns and villages. At the trial, he famously told the judge he had no jurisdiction to try him because he is one of the accusers and also the judge. He was convicted and imprisoned for a year.

Agwuna became the Eze of Enugu-Ukwu, Anambra State in 1958 and later became Igwe of Umunri in 1960. He established Obu Ofo Nri Museum as a repository of the cultural heritage of Enugu-Ukwu and other Nigerian communities. The museum was established before the Civil War and parts of it was destroyed during the war.

References

Sources

Nigerian activists
1921 births
2007 deaths